This topic reveals a large number of triathlon events and their results for 2015.

World Triathlon Series
 March 6 – September 20: 2015 ITU World Triathlon Series
 March 6 & 7 in  Abu Dhabi
 Men's Elite winner:  Mario Mola
 Women's Elite winner:  Gwen Jorgensen
 March 28 & 29 in  Auckland
 Men's Elite winner:  Jonathan Brownlee
 Women's Elite winner:  Gwen Jorgensen
 April 11 & 12 in  Gold Coast
 Men's Elite winner:  Jonathan Brownlee
 Women's Elite winner:  Gwen Jorgensen
 April 25 & 26 in  Cape Town
 Men's Elite winner:  Alistair Brownlee
 Women's Elite winner:  Vicky Holland
 May 16 & 17 in  Yokohama
 Men's Elite winner:  Javier Gómez Noya
 Women's Elite winner:  Gwen Jorgensen
 May 30 & 31 in  London
 Men's Elite winner:  Alistair Brownlee
 Women's Elite winner:  Gwen Jorgensen
 July 18 & 19 in  Hamburg
 Men's Elite winner:  Vincent Luis
 Women's Elite winner:  Gwen Jorgensen
 August 22 & 23 in  Stockholm
 Men's Elite winner:  Javier Gómez Noya
 Women's Elite winner:  Sarah True
 September 5 & 6 in  Edmonton
 Men's Elite winner:  Richard Murray
 Women's Elite winner:  Vicky Holland
 September 15 – 20 in  Chicago (Grand Final)
 Aquathlon
 Men's Elite Aquathlon winner:  Richard Varga
 Women's Elite Aquathlon winner:  Anastasia Abrosimova
 Men's Junior Aquathlon winner:  Yhousman Perdomo
 Women's Junior Aquathlon winner:  Elisabetta Vitasović
 Men's Under 23 Aquathlon winner:  Ben Sayles
 Women's Under 23 Aquathlon winner:  Joselyn Brea
 Individual events
 Men's Elite winner:  Mario Mola
 Women's Elite winner:  Gwen Jorgensen
 Men's Junior winner:  Manoel Messias
 Women's Junior winner:  Laura Lindemann
 Men's Under 23 winner:  Jake Birtwhistle
 Women's Under 23 winner:  Audrey Merle

Triathlon World Cup
 March 14 – October 25: 2015 ITU World Cup
 March 14 & 15: 2015 Mooloolaba ITU Triathlon World Cup #1 in 
 Men's Elite winner:  David Hauss
 Women's Elite winner:  Tamara Gómez Garrido
 March 21 & 22: 2015 New Plymouth ITU Triathlon World Cup #2 in 
 Men's Elite winner:  Richard Murray
 Women's Elite winner:  Kaitlin Donner
 May 9 & 10: 2015 Chengdu ITU Triathlon World Cup #3 in 
 Men's Elite winner:  Ryan Fisher
 Women's Elite winner:  Renee Tomlin
 June 14: 2015 Huatulco ITU Triathlon World Cup #4 in 
 Men's Elite winner:  Irving Perez
 Women's Elite winner:  Valentina Carvallo
 August 8 & 9: 2015 Tiszaújváros ITU Triathlon World #5 in 
 Men's Elite winner:  Igor Andreyevich Polyanski
 Women's Elite winner:  Felicity Sheedy-Ryan
 September 12 & 13: 2015 Montreal ITU Triathlon World Cup #6 in 
 Cancelled, due to the schedule of other events that conflicts with this World Cup. There would not be any replacement event here.
 October 4: 2015 Cozumel ITU Triathlon World Cup #7 in Mexico
 Men's Elite winner:  Richard Murray
 Women's Elite winner:  Ai Ueda
 October 17 & 18: 2015 Alanya ITU Triathlon World Cup #8 in 
 Men's Elite winner:  João José Pereira
 Women's Elite winner:  Yuliya Yelistratova
 Men's Elite winner:  Matthew Sharp
 Women's Elite winner:  Yuka Sato

Cross triathlon
 February 28 & March 1: 2015 OTU Cross Triathlon Oceania Championships in  Snowy Mountains
 Men's Elite winner:  Courtney Atkinson
 Women's Elite winner:  Erin Densham
 March 28: 2015 Pokhara ASTC Cross Triathlon South Asian Championships in 
 Men's Elite winner:  Mahesh Lourembam
 Women's Elite winner:  Pooja Chaurushi
 June 14: 2015 Revine Lago - Tarzo ETU TNatura Cross Triathlon European Cup in 
 Men's Elite winner:  Arthur Serrieres
 Women's Elite winner:  Monica Cibin
 July 19: 2015 ETU TNatura Cross Triathlon European Championships in  Schluchsee, Baden-Württemberg
 Men's Elite winner:  Arthur Forissier
 Women's Elite winner:  Renata Bucher
 September 26 & 27: 2015 ITU Cross Triathlon World Championships in  Sardinia
 Men's Elite winner:  Ruben Ruzafa
 Women's Elite winner:  Flora Duffy

Duathlon
 January 9 & 10: 2015 ATU Sprint Duathlon African and Pan Arab Championships in  Luxor
 Men's Elite winner:  Yegor Martynenko
 Women's Elite winner:  Oleksandra Stepanenko
 April 25: 2015 ETU Sprint and Standard Distance Duathlon European Championships in  Alcobendas
 Men's Elite winner:  Benoit Nicolas
 Women's Elite winner:  Sandra Levenez
 Men's Juniors winner:  Ignacio Gonzalez Garcia
 Women's Juniors winner:  Lucie Picard
 Men's U23 winner:  Filipe Azevedo
 Women's U23 winner:  Giorgia Priarone
 July 25 & 26: 2015 CAMTRI Duathlon American Championships in  Cali
 Men's Elite winner:  David Guete
 Women's Elite winner:  Nayara Luniere
 October 14 – 18: 2015 ITU Duathlon World Championships in  Adelaide
 Men's Elite winner:  Emilio Martin
 Women's Elite winner:  Emma Pallant
 Junior Men's winner:  Ben Dijkstra
 Junior Women's winner:  Gizelde Strauss
 Men's U23 winner:  Matthew Mcelroy
 Women's U23 winner:  Annelise Jefferies

Long distance triathlon
 January 25: 2015 ITU Long Distance Triathlon and Iberoamerican Championships in  Havana
 Men's Elite winner:  Juan Manuel Asconape
 Women's Elite winner:  Kathleen Smith
 April 11 & 12: 2015 ETU Powerman Long Distance and Sprint Duathlon European Championships in  Horst aan de Maas
 Men's Elite winner:  Kenneth Vandendriessche
 Women's Elite winner:  Laura Hrebec
 Men's Elite Sprint Distance winner:  Alberto Della Pasqua
 Women's Elite Sprint Distance winner:  Franziska Scheffler
 May 24: 2015 ETU Challenge Middle Distance Triathlon European Championships in  Rimini
 Men's Elite winner:  Filip Ospaly
 Women's Elite winner:  Kaisa Lehtonen
 June 27: 2015 ITU Long Distance Triathlon World Championships in  Motala
 Men's Elite winner:  Cyril Viennot
 Women's Elite winner:  Mary Beth Ellis
 September 13: 2015 Weihai ITU Long Distance Triathlon Series Event in 
 Men's Elite winner:  Nikolay Yaroshenko
 Women's Elite winner:  Ewa Bugdol
 September 13: 2015 ETU Challenge Long Distance Triathlon European Championships in  Weymouth, Dorset
 Men's Elite winner:  Marek Jaskolka
 Women's Elite winner:  Camilla Lindholm

Winter triathlon
 January 31: 2015 ETU Winter Triathlon European Championships in  Reinosa
 Men's Elite winner:  Pavel Andreev
 Women's Elite winner:  Olga Parfinenko
 February 8: 2015 Quebec ITU S3 Winter Triathlon World Cup in  Quebec City
 Men's Elite winner:  Pavel Andreev
 Women's Elite winner:  Olga Parfinenko
 February 14: 2015 Lahti ITU S3 Winter Triathlon World Cup in 
 Men's Elite winner:  Pavel Andreev
 Women's Elite winner:  Claude Godbout

European Cup (ETU)
 March 21 – September 26: European Triathlon Union Cup
 March 21 & 22: 2015 ETU Triathlon European Cup #1 in  Quarteira
 Men's Elite winner:  Dorian Coninx
 Women's Elite winner:  Gillian Sanders
 April 19: 2015 ETU Triathlon European Cup #2 in  Melilla
 Men's Elite winner:  Gordon Benson
 Women's Elite winner:  Marlene Gomez-Islinger
 May 3: 2015 ETU Triathlon European Cup #3 in  Antalya
 Men's Elite winner:  Mark Buckingham
 Women's Elite winner:  Elena Danilova
 June 21: 2015 ETU Sprint Triathlon European Cup #4 in  Burgas
 Men's Elite winner:  Brice Daubord
 Women's Elite winner:  Yuliya Yelistratova
 June 27: 2015 ETU Triathlon European Cup #5 in  Kyiv
 Men's Elite winner:  Yegor Martynenko
 Women's Elite winner:  Inna Ryzhykh
 June 28: 2015 ETU Sprint Triathlon European Cup #6 in  Istanbul
 Men's Elite winner:  Felix Duchampt
 Women's Elite winner:  Lisa Norden
 July 4: 2015 ETU Triathlon Premium European Cup #7 in  Holten
 Men's Elite winner:  Aurélien Lebrun
 Women's Elite winner:  Rachel Klamer
 July 5: 2015 ETU Sprint Triathlon European Cup #8 in  Tartu
 Men's Elite winner:  Declan Wilson
 Women's Elite winner:  Zsanett Horváth
 July 19: 2015 ETU Triathlon European Cup #9 in  Châteauroux
 Men's Elite winner:  Aurélien Lebrun
 Women's Elite winner:  Lisa Sieburger
 August 9: 2015 ETU Sprint Triathlon European Cup #10 in  Riga
 Men's Elite winner:  Alexander Bryukhankov
 Women's Elite winner:  Lisa Sieburger
 August 15 & 16: 2015 ETU Triathlon European Cup #11 in  Eğirdir
 Men's Elite winner:  Denis Vasiliev
 Women's Elite winner:  Arina Shulgina
 August 23: 2015 ETU Triathlon European Cup #12 in  Karlovy Vary
 Men's Elite winner:  Aurélien Lebrun
 Women's Elite winner:  Audrey Merle
 September 6: 2015 ETU Triathlon Premium European Cup #13 in  Constanța-Mamaia (final)
 Men's Elite winner:  Uxio Abuin Ares
 Women's Elite winner:  Valentina Zapatrina
 September 26: 2015 ETU Triathlon European Cup Final in  Sochi
 Men's Elite winner:  Dmitry Polyanskiy
 Women's Elite winner:  Lisa Sieburger

Junior European Cup (ETU)
 March 21 – October 18: 2015 European Triathlon Union Junior Cup
 March 21 & 22: 2015 Quarteira ETU Triathlon Junior European Cup #1 in 
 Junior Men:  Ben Dijkstra
 Junior Women:  Lisa Tertsch
 April 19: 2015 Melilla ETU Triathlon Junior European Cup #2 in 
 Junior Men:  Ignacio Gonzalez Garcia
 Junior Women:  Cecilia Santamaria Surroca
 May 30: 2015 Vienna ETU Triathlon Junior European Cup #3 in 
 Junior Men:  Lasse Lührs
 Junior Women:  Alberte Kjær Pedersen
 June 6: 2015 Kupiškis ETU Triathlon Junior European Cup #4 in 
 Junior Men:  Omri Bahat
 Junior Women:  Yuval Gome
 June 21: 2015 Burgas ETU Junior Triathlon European Cup #5 in 
 Junior Men:  Mikita Katsianeu
 Junior Women:  Therese Feuersinger
 July 4: 2015 Holten ETU Triathlon Junior European Cup #6 in the 
 Junior Men:  Gustav Iden
 Junior Women:  Taylor Knibb
 July 18: 2015 Châteauroux ETU Triathlon Junior European Cup #7 in 
 Junior Men:  Matthew Roberts
 Junior Women:  Jana Machacova
 August 2: 2015 Tábor ETU Triathlon Junior European Cup #8 in the 
 Junior Men:  Ayan Beisenbayev
 Junior Women:  Jana Machacova
 August 8: 2015 Tiszaújváros ETU Triathlon Junior European Cup #9 in 
 Junior Men:  Ben Dijkstra
 Junior Women:  Olivia Mathias
 August 30: 2015 Tulcea ETU Triathlon Junior European Cup #10 in 
 Junior Men:  Tim Siepmann
 Junior Women:  Nina Eim
 September 5: 2015 Bled ETU Triathlon Junior European Cup #11 in 
 Junior Men:  Gabriel Sandör
 Junior Women:  Lisa Tertsch
 Junior Men:  Max Studer
 Junior Women:  Alberte Kjær Pedersen

Oceania Triathlon Union (OTU)
 January 9 – October 25: 2015 Oceania Triathlon Union events
 January 9: 2015 OTU Triathlon Mixed Relay Oceania Championships in  Mount Maunganui
 For main website, click here .
 January 10 & 11: 2015 OTU Triathlon Junior Oceania Championships in  Penrith, New South Wales
 Junior Men:  Matthew Hauser
 Junior Women:  Kira Hedgeland
 January 11: 2015 OTU Paratriathlon Oceania Championships in  Penrith
 Note: There was no Women's PT2 event here.
 Men's PT1 winner:  Bill Chaffey
 Men's PT2 winner:  Brant Garvey
 Men's PT3 winner:  Justin Godfrey (default)
 Men's PT4 winner:  Jack Swift
 Men's PT5 winner:  Jonathan Goerlach
 Women's PT1 winner:  Emily Tapp (default)
 Women's PT3 winner:  Sally Pilbeam
 Women's PT4 winner:  Claire Mclean
 Women's PT5 winner:  Casey Hyde (default)
 February 1: 2015 OTU Sprint Triathlon Oceania Championships in  Kinloch
 Men's Elite winner:  Sam Osborne
 Women's Elite winner:  Sophie Corbidge
 February 13: 2015 OTU Sprint Triathlon Oceania Cup #1 in  Takapuna
 Men's Elite winner:  Ryan Sissons
 Women's Elite winner:  Sophie Corbidge
 February 21: 2015 OTU Triathlon Oceania Championships in  Devonport, Tasmania
 Men's Elite winner:  Jacob Birtwhistle
 Women's Elite winner:  Jaz Hedgeland
 March 7 & 8: 2015 OTU Sprint Triathlon Oceania Cup #2 in  Wollongong
 Men's Elite winner:  Jacob Birtwhistle
 Women's Elite winner:  Amelie Kretz 
 March 14 & 15: 2015 OTU Triathlon Oceania Cup #3 in  Mooloolaba
 Men's Elite winner:  Daniel Coleman
 Women's Elite winner:  Kelly-Ann Perkins
 June 6 & 7: 2015 OTU Sprint Triathlon Oceania Cup #4 in  Suva
 Men's Elite winner:  Matthew Hauser
 Women's Elite winner:  Brittany Dutton
 October 25: 2015 OTU Triathlon Oceania Cup #5 in  Tahiti (final)
 Men's Elite winner:  James Chronis

Confederación Americana de Triathlon (CAMTRI)
 January 16 – December 6: 2015 CAMTRI American Cup events
 January 16 – 18: 2015 CAMTRI Triathlon American Cup and South American Championships in  La Paz, Entre Ríos
 Men's Elite winner:  Gonzalo Tellechea
 Women's Elite winner:  Valentina Carvallo
 January 24: 2015 CAMTRI Sprint Triathlon American Cup and Iberoamerican Championships in  Havana
 Men's Elite winner:  Rodrigo González
 Women's Elite winner:  Renee Tomlin
 January 25: 2015 CAMTRI Middle Distance Triathlon Iberoamerican Championships in Havana 
 Men's Elite winner:  Marcel Zamora
 Women's Elite winner:  Mathilde Batailler
 February 1: 2015 Punta Guilarte CAMTRI Triathlon American Cup in  Arroyo, Puerto Rico
 Men's Elite winner:  Leonardo Chacón
 Women's Elite winner:  Erin Jones
 February 14: 2015 Mendoza CAMTRI Triathlon American Cup in 
 Men's Elite winner:  Gonzalo Tellechea
 Women's Elite winner:  Valentina Carvallo
 February 22: 2015 Barranquilla CAMTRI Triathlon American Cup and Central American and Caribbean Championships in 
 Men's Elite winner:  Bruno Matheus
 Women's Elite winner:  Lisandra Hernandez
 February 28: 2015 Mazatlán CAMTRI Triathlon American Cup in 
 Men's Elite winner:  Rodrigo González
 Women's Elite winner:  Andrea Diaz
 March 7 & 8: 2015 Clermont CAMTRI Sprint Triathlon American Cup in the 
 Men's Elite winner:  Kaleb Vanort 
 Women's Elite winner:  Sarah Haskins
 March 8: 2015 Playa Hermosa CAMTRI Triathlon American Cup in 
 Men's Elite winner:  Juan Jose Andrade Figueroa
 Women's Elite winner:  Melissa Rios 
 March 14 & 15: 2015 Sarasota CAMTRI Sprint Triathlon American Cup and Caribbean Championships in the United States
 Men's Elite winner:  Eric Lagerstrom
 Women's Elite winner:  Summer Cook
 March 14 & 15: 2015 Lima CAMTRI Triathlon American Cup and Bolivarian Championships in 
 Men's Elite winner:  Felipe van de Wyngard
 Women's Elite winner:  Favia Diaz
 March 21: 2015 La Paz CAMTRI Triathlon American Cup in Mexico
 Men's Elite winner:  Felipe van de Wyngard
 Women's Elite winner:  Dominika Jamnicky
 April 12: 2015 Salinas CAMTRI Triathlon American Cup in 
 Men's Elite winner:  Manoel Messias
 Women's Elite winner:  Elizabeth Bravo
 April 18: 2015 Puerto San José CAMTRI Triathlon Junior Central American and Caribbean Championships in 
 Men's Junior winner:  Peter Vega
 Women's Junior winner:  Giovanna Michelle Gonzalez Miranda
 April 18 & 19: 2015 Bridgetown CAMTRI Sprint Triathlon American Cup in 
 Men's Elite winner:  Eric Lagerstrom
 Women's Elite winner:  Erin Dolan
 May 1 – 3: 2015 Monterrey CAMTRI Triathlon American Championships in Mexico
 Men's Elite winner:  Cesar Saracho
 Women's Elite winner:  Cecilia Gabriela Perez Flores
 May 23: 2015 Ixtapa CAMTRI Triathlon American Cup in Mexico
 Men's Elite winner:  John O'Neill
 Women's Elite winner:  Vanesa de la Torre
 June 6: 2015 Dallas CAMTRI Sprint Triathlon American Cup in the United States
 Men's Elite winner:  Russell Pennock
 Women's Elite winner:  Erin Jones
 June 20: 2015 Monroe CAMTRI Triathlon Junior American Cup in the United States
 Men's Junior winner:  Darr Smith
 Women's Junior winner:  Tamara Gorman
 June 20 & 21: 2015 Ibarra CAMTRI Triathlon American Cup in Ecuador
 Men's Elite winner:  Eder Mejia
 Women's Elite winner:  Elizabeth Bravo
 July 25 & 26: 2015 Magog CAMTRI Triathlon American Cup in 
 Men's Elite winner:  Eli Hemming
 Women's Elite winner:  Erin Dolan
 September 5: 2015 Edmonton CAMTRI Triathlon Junior American Cup in Canada
 Junior Men's winner:  Matthew Hauser
 Junior Women's winner:  Kyla Roy
 October 11: 2015 Punta Guilarte CAMTRI Triathlon Premium American Cup in Puerto Rico
 Men's Elite winner:  Jason West
 Women's Elite winner:  Taylor Spivey
 October 18: 2015 Cartagena CAMTRI Triathlon American Cup in Colombia
 Men's Elite winner:  Jason West
 Women's Elite winner:  Steffy Mishel Salazar Perez
 November 15: 2015 Buenos Aires CAMTRI Triathlon American Cup Final in Argentina
 Men's Elite winner:  Reinaldo Colucci
 Women's Elite winner:  Beatriz Neres
 November 21: 2015 La Paz CAMTRI Triathlon Junior American Cup in 
 Junior Men's winner:  Gabriel Bravo
 Junior Women's winner:  Isabel Berrezueta
 Men's Elite winner:  Salvador Ruiz Gonzales

African Triathlon Union (ATU)
 February 15 – November 7: 2015 ATU Triathlon African Cup events
 February 15: 2015 Cape Town ATU Sprint Triathlon African Cup in 
 Men's Elite winner:  Henri Schoeman
 Women's Elite winner:  Flora Duffy
 March 1: 2015 Buffalo City ATU Sprint Triathlon African Cup in South Africa
 Men's Elite winner:  Jonas Schomburg
 Women's Elite winner:  Carlyn Fischer
 March 14: 2015 Hurghada ATU Triathlon African Cup in 
 Men's Elite winner:  Rostyslav Pevtsov
 Women's Elite winner:  Arina Shulgina
 March 28: 2015 Troutbeck ATU Triathlon African Cup in 
 Men's Elite winner:  Wian Sullwald
 Women's Elite winner:  Jodie Berry
 June 7: 2015 Le Morne ATU Sprint Triathlon African Cup in 
 Men's Elite winner:  Basson Engelbrecht
 Women's Elite winner:  Emma Jeffcoat
 October 24: 2015 Larache ATU Sprint Triathlon African Cup in 
 Men's Elite winner:  Antonio Benito
 Women's Elite winner:  Melanie Santos
 November 7: 2015 Agadir ATU Triathlon African Cup in Morocco (final)
 Men's Elite winner:  Aleksandr Latin
 Women's Elite winner:  Mari Rabie

Asian Triathlon Confederation (ASTC)
 April 25 – November 28: 2015 ASTC Triathlon Asian Cup events
 April 25 & 26: 2015 Subic Bay ASTC Triathlon Asian Cup in the 
 Men's Elite winner:  Tyler Mislawchuk
 Women's Elite winner:  Chika Sato
 June 21: 2015 Gamagōri ASTC Triathlon Asian Cup in 
 Men's Elite winner:  Jumpei Furuya
 Women's Elite winner:  Yurie Kato
 June 27: 2015 Burabay District ASTC Sprint Triathlon Asian Cup in 
 Men's Elite winner:  Ayan Beisenbayev
 Women's Elite winner:  Hilda Yan Yin Choi
 July 4: 2015 Shizuishan ASTC Triathlon Premium Asian Cup in China
 Men's Elite winner:  Bai Faquan
 Women's Elite winner:  WANG Lianyuan
 July 12: 2015 Osaka ASTC Sprint Triathlon Asian Cup in Japan
 Men's Elite winner:  Kohei Tsubaki
 Women's Elite winner:  Yuka Sato
 September 20: 2015 Murakami ASTC Triathlon Asian Cup in Japan
 Men's Elite winner:  Heo Min-ho
 Women's Elite winner:  Melinda Vernon
 October 17: 2015 Changshou ASTC Triathlon Premium Asian Cup in  Chongqing
 Men's Elite winner:  BAI Faquan
 Women's Elite winner:  WANG Lianyuan
 October 31 & November 1: 2015 Hong Kong ASTC Sprint Triathlon Asian Cup in Lantau Island
 Men's Elite winner:  Ron Darmon
 Women's Elite winner:  Mari Rabie
 Men's Elite winner:  Jumpei Furuya
 Women's Elite winner:  Emma Jeffcoat

Paratriathlon
 March 1 – September 20: 2015 ITU World Paratriathlon Events
 March 1: 2015 Buffalo City ITU World Paratriathlon Event in 
 Note: There was no Women's PT3 event here.
 Men's PT1 winner:  Giovanni Achenza
 Men's PT2 winner:  Stéphane Bahier
 Men's PT3 winner:  Dylan da Silva
 Men's PT4 winner:  Yannick Bourseaux
 Men's PT5 winner:  Alen Kobilica 
 Women's PT1 winner:  Eva María Moral Pedrero (default)
 Women's PT2 winner:  Rakel Mateo Uriarte (default)
 Women's PT4 winner:  Clare Cunningham
 Women's PT5 winner:  Rhiannon Henry
 March 13: 2015 Sunshine Coast ITU World Paratriathlon Event in 
 Men's PT1 winner:  Bill Chaffey
 Men's PT2 winner:  Brant Garvey
 Men's PT3 winner:  Justin Godfrey (default)
 Men's PT4 winner:  Jack Swift
 Men's PT5 winner:  Jonathan Goerlach
 Women's PT1 winner:  Emily Tapp
 Women's PT2 winner:  Hailey Danisewicz
 Women's PT3 winner:  Kerryn Harvey
 Women's PT4 winner:  Claire Mclean
 Women's PT5 winner:  Katie Kelly
 May 1 – 3: 2015 Monterrey CAMTRI Triathlon American Championships in 
 Men's PT1 winner:  Krige Schabort
 Men's PT2 winner:  Mark Barr
 Men's PT3 winner:  Roberto Carlos Silva
 Men's PT4 winner:  Stefan Daniel
 Men's PT5 winner:  Aaron Scheidies
 Women's PT1 winner:  Kendall Gretsch
 Women's PT2 winner:  Hailey Danisewicz
 Women's PT3 winner:  Fernanda Katheline Pereira (default)
 Women's PT4 winner:  Chantal Givens
 Women's PT5 winner:  Patricia Walsh 
 May 10: 2015 Madrid ITU World Paratriathlon Event in 
 Men's PT1 winner:  Jetze Plat
 Men's PT2 winner:  Vasily Egorov
 Men's PT3 winner:  Daniel Molina
 Men's PT4 winner:  Martin Schulz
 Men's PT5 winner:  Alen Kobilica 
 Women's PT1 winner:  Rita Cuccuru (default)
 Women's PT2 winner:  Elise Marc
 Women's PT3 winner:  Nora Hansel (default)
 Women's PT4 winner:  Gwladys Lemoussu
 Women's PT5 winner:  Susana Rodriguez
 May 16: 2015 Yokohama ITU World Paratriathlon Event (held in conjunction with that city's World Triathlon Series event)
 Note: There was no Women's PT3 event here.
 Men's PT1 winner:  Krige Schabort
 Men's PT2 winner:  Mark Barr
 Men's PT3 winner:  Denis Kungurtcev
 Men's PT4 winner:  Alexander Yalchik
 Men's PT5 winner:  Łukasz Wietecki
 Women's PT1 winner:  Emily Tapp (default)
 Women's PT2 winner:  Yukako Hata
 Women's PT4 winner:  Kate Doughty
 Women's PT5 winner:  Katie Kelly
 May 30: 2015 London ITU World Paratriathlon Event (held in conjunction with that city's World Triathlon Series event)
 Note: There was no Women's PT3 event here.
 Men's PT1 winner:  Bill Chaffey
 Men's PT2 winner:  Michele Ferrarin
 Men's PT3 winner:  Alejandro Sánchez Palomero
 Men's PT4 winner:  Stefan Daniel
 Men's PT5 winner:  Łukasz Wietecki
 Women's PT1 winner:  Mary Catherine Callahan
 Women's PT2 winner:  Saskia van den Ouden
 Women's PT4 winner:  Lauren Steadman
 Women's PT5 winner:  Melissa Reid
 June 7: 2015 Besançon ITU World Paratriathlon Event in 
 Note: There was no Women's PT3 and PT4 events here.
 Men's PT1 winner:  Geert Schipper
 Men's PT2 winner:  Stefan Loesler
 Men's PT3 winner:  Alessio Borgato
 Men's PT4 winner:  Yannick Bourseaux
 Men's PT5 winner:  Vasyl Zakrevskyi
 Women's PT1 winner:  Rita Cuccuru (default)
 Women's PT2 winner:  Elise Marc
 Women's PT5 winner:  Alison Patrick
 July 18: 2015 Iseo – Franciacorta ITU World Paratriathlon Event in 
 Note: There was no Women's PT3 event here.
 Men's PT1 winner:  Geert Schipper
 Men's PT2 winner:  Vasily Egorov
 Men's PT3 winner:  Oliver Dreier
 Men's PT4 winner:  Martin Schulz
 Men's PT5 winner:  Arnaud Grandjean
 Women's PT1 winner:  Lizzie Tench
 Women's PT2 winner:  Saskia van den Ouden
 Women's PT4 winner:  Gwladys Lemoussu
 Women's PT5 winner:  Katie Kelly
 Note: There was no Women's PT1 and PT3 events here.
 Men's PT1 winner:  Bill Chaffey
 Men's PT2 winner:  Vasily Egorov
 Men's PT3 winner:  Jorge Luis Fonseca
 Men's PT4 winner:  Martin Schulz
 Men's PT5 winner:  Jose Luis García Serrano
 Women's PT2 winner:  Hailey Danisewicz
 Women's PT4 winner:  Lauren Steadman
 Women's PT5 winner:  Alison Patrick
 August 16: 2015 Detroit ITU World Paratriathlon Event in the 
 Men's PT1 winner:  Fernando Aranha
 Men's PT2 winner:  Ryan Taylor
 Men's PT3 winner:  Andre Cilliers
 Men's PT4 winner:  Chris Hammer
 Men's PT5 winner:  Aaron Scheidies
 Women's PT1 winner:  Kendall Gretsch
 Women's PT2 winner:  Melissa Stockwell
 Women's PT3 winner:  Andrea Walton (default)
 Women's PT4 winner:  Clare Cunningham
 Women's PT5 winner:  Patricia Walsh
 August 16: 2015 Subic Bay ASTC Paratriathlon Asian Championships in the 
 Note: There was no Women's PT1 to PT4 events here.
 Men's PT1 winner:  Junpei Kimura
 Men's PT2 winner:  Kenshiro Nakayama
 Men's PT3 winner:  Hideki Uda
 Men's PT4 winner:  Keiichi Sato
 Men's PT5 winner:  Ryu Nakazawa
 Women's PT5 winner:  Atsuko Yamada (default)
 September 5 & 6: 2015 Edmonton ITU World Paratriathlon Event (in conjunction with that city's World Triathlon Series event)
 Note: There was no Women's PT1 event here.
 Men's PT1 winner:  Giovanni Achenza
 Men's PT2 winner:  Mohamed Lahna
 Men's PT3 winner:  Andre Cilliers
 Men's PT4 winner:  Stefan Daniel
 Men's PT5 winner:  Lowell Taylor (default)
 Women's PT2 winner:  Allysa Seely
 Women's PT3 winner:  Andrea Walton (default)
 Women's PT4 winner:  Patricia Collins
 Women's PT5 winner:  Amy Dixon
 September 15 – 20: 2015 Chicago ITU World Paratriathlon Championships (held in conjunction with that city's World Triathlon Series Grand Final)
 Men's PT1 winner:  Bill Chaffey
 Men's PT2 winner:  Michele Ferrarin
 Men's PT3 winner:  Oliver Dreier
 Men's PT4 winner:  Stefan Daniel
 Men's PT5 winner:  Aaron Scheidies
 Women's PT1 winner:  Kendall Gretsch
 Women's PT2 winner:  Allysa Seely
 Women's PT3 winner:  Sally Pilbeam
 Women's PT4 winner:  Lauren Steadman
 Women's PT5 winner:  Katie Kelly

Other triathlon events
 March 7: 2015 João Pessoa CAMTRI Triathlon Junior South American Championships in 
 Junior Men's winner:  Manoel Messias 
 Junior Women's winner:  Barbara Santos 
 March 14: 2015 Sarasota CAMTRI Triathlon Junior North American Championships in the 
 Junior Men's winner:  Austin Hindman
 Junior Women's winner:  Emy Legault
 March 14 & 15: 2015 Sarasota CAMTRI Triathlon Mixed Relay American and Caribbean Championships in the United States
 4 x Mixed Relay winners:  (Emy Legault, John Rasmussen, Dominika Jamnicky, and Jeremy Briand)
 April 18: 2015 Puerto San José CAMTRI Triathlon Junior Central American and Caribbean Championships in 
 Junior Men's winner:  Peter Vega
 Junior Women's winner:  Giovanna Michelle Gonzalez Miranda
 May 9 & 10: 2015 Sharm el-Sheikh ATU Triathlon African Championships and Pan Arab Championships in 
 Men's Elite winner:  Henri Schoeman
 Women's Elite winner:  Gillian Sanders
 Junior Men's winner:  Nicholas Quenet
 Junior Women's winner:  Giselde Strauss
 June 6: 2015 Kupiškis ETU Triathlon Baltic Championships in 
 Men's Elite winner:  Aliaksandr Vasilevich
 Women's Elite winner:  Amanda Bohlin
 June 11 – 14: 2015 New Taipei ASTC Triathlon Asian Championships in 
 Men's Elite winner:  Yuichi Hosoda
 Women's Elite winner:  Ai Ueda
 Junior Men's winner:  KOK Yu Hang
 Junior Women's winner:  JEONG Hye-rim
 June 27: 2015 ETU Aquathlon European Championships in  Cologne
 Men's Elite winner:  Tomáš Svoboda
 Women's Elite winner:  Hannah Kitchen
 Junior Men's winner:  Urh Klenovšek
 Junior Women's winner:  Simona Simunkova
 July 9 – 12: 2015 ETU European Triathlon Championships in  Geneva
 Men's Elite winner:  David Hauss
 Women's Elite winner:  Nicola Spirig
 Junior Men's winner:  Lasse Lührs
 Junior Women's winner:  Laura Lindemann
 July 18 & 19: 2015 ITU Triathlon Mixed Relay World Championships in  Hamburg
 4 x Mixed Relay winners:  (Jeanne Lehair, Dorian Coninx, Audrey Merle, and Vincent Luis)
 July 25 & 26: 2015 ETU Triathlon U23 & Youth European Championships in  Banyoles
 Men's U23 winner:  David Castro Fajardo
 Women's U23 winner:  Lucy Hall
 Men's Youth Team Relay winners:  (Cameron Harris, Alex Chantler Mayne, Ben Dijkstra)
 Women's Youth Team Relay winners:  (Maria Tchuiko, Elizaveta Zhizhina, Ekaterina Matyukh)
 4 x Mixed Relay U23 winners:  (Ilaria Zane, Riccardo de Palma, Angelica Olmo, Delian Stateff)
 August 2: 2015 Rio de Janeiro ITU World Olympic Qualification Event in Brazil (Olympic Test Event)
 Men's Elite winner:  Francisco Javier Gómez Noya
 Women's Elite winner:  Gwen Jorgensen

References

 
Triathlon by year